Paul Alborough (born 1 June 1975), professionally known as Professor Elemental, is a steampunk and chap hop musical artist.

Career

Professor Elemental began his career as Emcee Elemental. The character of Professor Elemental arose from a planned concept album. While the album never came to fruition, the character stuck. Professor Elemental has since been seen performing as a solo act or in theatre acts such as Come into My Parlour. He is also popular at steampunk events and has been a headliner at the Steampunk World's Fair and the Waltz on the Wye.

The Professor Elemental character first gained attention with his music video for "Cup of Brown Joy", directed by Moog, which got the attention of Warren Ellis.  Since then he has released a new album, continued his work in the community and performed live.  He was, for a time, in a friendly feud with fellow "chap-hop" artist Mr. B The Gentleman Rhymer. However, Professor Elemental had a short appearance in Mr. B's music video for the song "Just Like a Chap", of which Professor Elemental said "much as I hate to admit it, I bloody love that video and am jolly glad [Mr. B] let me gate crash." Mr. B reciprocated with a cameo on Elemental's video for his song, "I'm British" (which also featured appearances by members of the Eccentric Club, of which Elemental is a member). The two seem to have finally settled their differences in the track, "The Duel", on Elemental's 2012 album The Father of Invention, where, after a rap battle, both agree that the other is "jolly good" at what they do and go to enjoy a crate of sherry and some opium.

The short film The Chronicles of Professor Elemental was successfully funded via Crowdfunder in 2012, raising £7,226 - with 155 supporters in 45 days. The professor is called on, in the film, to find the statute of the golden frog. The 45-minute musical comedy was directed by Benjamin Field, starting Paul Alborough, Grace Alexander-Scott, and Dan Gingell, created by Hilton Productions Ltd, and released in 2013 via YouTube - in three parts. The videos were later made private and the whole film available to stream via Amazon Prime Video.

In 2013, he appeared in the "Steampunx" episode of Phineas and Ferb, as well as the episode "The Bewildering Bout of the Astounding Automatons" of Penn Zero: Part-Time Hero.

He collaborated with the steampunk rock group Steam Powered Giraffe on their song "Sky Sharks", from their 2015 album The Vice Quadrant: A Space Opera.

The 2015 album Apequest: The Search For Geoffery is inspiration for the Kickstarter funded board game Apequest, which has an expected release of May 2023.

Personal life

Originally from Ipswich, Alborough currently lives in Brighton.

Discography

Albums
 The Indifference Engine (2009) 
 More Tea? (2010)
 Special School: The Album (2011)
 Father of Invention (2012)
 The Giddy Limit (2014)
 Apequest: The Search for Geoffrey (2015)
 Professor Elemental and his amazing friends (2016)
 The School Of Whimsy (2018)
 Professor Elemental and his amazing friends: Part 2 (2019)
 Let's Get Messy (2020)
 Good Dad Club (2021)
 Nemesis! (2021)

References

External links
 
 Elemental page at Tea Sea Records

Living people
English male singer-songwriters
Musicians from Brighton and Hove
Clergy from Ipswich
Steampunk music
1975 births